Nosterella is a genus of spiders in the family Zodariidae. It was first described in 2017 by Baehr & Jocqué. , it contains 6 Australian species.

Species
Nosterella comprises the following species:
 N. cavicola Baehr & Jocqué, 2017 — Australia (Queensland)
 N. christineae Baehr & Jocqué, 2017 — Australia (Queensland)
 N. diabolica Baehr & Jocqué, 2017 — Australia (New South Wales)
 N. fitzgibboni Baehr & Jocqué, 2017 — Australia (Queensland)
 N. nadgee (Jocqué, 1995) (type) — Australia (Queensland, New South Wales, Lord Howe Is.)
 N. pollardi Baehr & Jocqué, 2017 — Australia (Lord Howe Is.)

References

Zodariidae
Araneomorphae genera
Spiders of Australia